Hydroxyzine, sold under the brand names Atarax, Vistaril and others, is an antihistamine medication. It is used in the treatment of itchiness, insomnia, anxiety, and nausea, including that due to motion sickness. It is used either by mouth or injection into a muscle.

Common side effects include sleepiness, headache, and a dry mouth. Serious side effects may include QT prolongation. It is unclear if use during pregnancy or breastfeeding is safe. Hydroxyzine works by blocking the effects of histamine. It is a first-generation antihistamine in the piperazine family of chemicals.

It was first made by Union Chimique Belge in 1956 and was approved for sale by Pfizer in the United States later that year. In 2020, it was the 70th most commonly prescribed medication in the United States, with more than 10million prescriptions.

Medical uses
Hydroxyzine is used in the treatment of itchiness, anxiety, and nausea due to motion sickness.

A systematic review concluded that hydroxyzine outperforms placebo in treating generalized anxiety disorder. Insufficient data were available to compare the drug with benzodiazepines and buspirone.

Hydroxyzine can also be used for the treatment of allergic conditions, such as chronic urticaria, atopic or contact dermatoses, and histamine-mediated pruritus. These have also been confirmed in both recent and past studies to have no adverse effects on the liver, blood, nervous system, or urinary tract.

Use of hydroxyzine for premedication as a sedative has no effects on tropane alkaloids, such as atropine, but may, following general anesthesia, potentiate meperidine and barbiturates, and use in pre-anesthetic adjunctive therapy should be modified depending upon the state of the individual.

Hydroxyzine is used as a non-barbiturate tranquilizer and for the treatment of neurological disorders, such as psychoneurosis and other forms of anxiety or tension states.

Doses of hydroxyzine hydrochloride used for sleep range from 25 to 100 mg. As with other antihistamine sleep aids, hydroxyzine is usually only prescribed for short term or "as-needed" use since tolerance to the CNS effects of hydroxyzine can develop in as little as a few days. A major systematic review and network meta-analysis of medications for the treatment of insomnia published in 2022 found little evidence to inform the use of hydroxyzine for insomnia.

Hydroxyzine has been used experimentally for the treatment of COVID-19. While other antihistamines have also been used for symptom reduction, hydroxyzine has a degree of direct antiviral effect.

Contraindications
The administration of hydroxyzine in large amounts by ingestion or intramuscular administration during the onset of pregnancy can cause fetal abnormalities. When administered to pregnant rats, mice and rabbits, hydroxyzine caused abnormalities such as hypogonadism with doses significantly above that of the human therapeutic range.

In humans, a significant dose has not yet been established in studies and, by default, the Food and Drug Administration (FDA) has introduced contraindication guidelines in regard to hydroxyzine. Use by those at risk for or showing previous signs of hypersensitivity is also contraindicated. Hydroxyzine is contraindicated for intravenous (IV) injection, as it has shown to cause hemolysis.

Other contraindications include the administration of hydroxyzine alongside depressants and other compounds which affect the central nervous system; if absolutely necessary, it should only be administered concomitantly in small doses. If administered in small doses with other substances, such as mentioned, then patients should refrain from using dangerous machinery, motor vehicles or any other practice requiring absolute concentration, in accordance with safety law.

Studies have also been conducted which show that long-term prescription of hydroxyzine can lead to tardive dyskinesia after years of use, but effects related to dyskinesia have also anecdotally been reported after periods of 7.5 months, such as continual head rolling, lip licking and other forms of athetoid movement. In certain cases, elderly patients' previous interactions with phenothiazine derivatives or pre-existing neuroleptic treatment may have contributed to dyskinesia at the administration of hydroxyzine due to hypersensitivity caused by prolonged treatment, and therefore some contraindication is given for short-term administration of hydroxyzine to those with previous phenothiazine use.

Side effects
Several reactions have been noted in manufacturer guidelines—deep sleep, incoordination, sedation, calmness, and dizziness have been reported in children and adults, as well as others such as hypotension, tinnitus, and headaches. Gastrointestinal effects have also been observed, as well as less serious effects such as dryness of the mouth and constipation caused by the mild antimuscarinic properties of hydroxyzine.

Central nervous system effects such as hallucinations or confusion have been observed in rare cases, attributed mostly to overdosage.  Such properties have been attributed to hydroxyzine in several cases, particularly in patients treated for neuropsychological disorders, as well as in cases where overdoses have been observed. While there are reports of the "hallucinogenic" or "hypnotic" properties of hydroxyzine, several clinical data trials have not reported such side effects from the sole consumption of hydroxyzine, but rather, have described its overall calming effect described through the stimulation of areas within the reticular formation. The hallucinogenic or hypnotic properties have been described as being an additional effect from overall central nervous system suppression by other CNS agents, such as lithium or ethanol.

Hydroxyzine exhibits anxiolytic and sedative properties in many psychiatric patients. One study showed that patients reported very high levels of subjective sedation when first taking the drug, but that levels of reported sedation decreased markedly over 5–7 days, likely due to CNS receptor desensitization. Other studies have suggested that hydroxyzine acts as an acute hypnotic, reducing sleep onset latency and increasing sleep duration — also showing that some drowsiness did occur. This was observed more in female patients, who also had greater hypnotic response. The use of sedating drugs alongside hydroxyzine can cause oversedation and confusion if administered at high doses—any form of hydroxyzine treatment alongside sedatives should be done under supervision of a doctor.

Because of the potential for more severe side effects, this drug is on the list to avoid in the elderly.

In 2015, the European Medicines Agency (EMA) announced a small but definite risk of QT prolongation associated with the use of hydroxyzine.
This side effect is more likely to occur in people with pre-existing cardiac disease, or with the use of other medicines known to prolong the QT interval.

Pharmacology

Pharmacodynamics

Hydroxyzine's predominant mechanism of action is as a potent and selective histamine H1 receptor inverse agonist. This action is responsible for its antihistamine and sedative effects. Unlike many other first-generation antihistamines, hydroxyzine has a lower affinity for the muscarinic acetylcholine receptors, and in accordance, has a lower risk of anticholinergic side effects. In addition to its antihistamine activity, hydroxyzine has also been shown to act more weakly as an antagonist of the serotonin 5-HT2A receptor, the dopamine D2 receptor, and the α1-adrenergic receptor. The weak antiserotonergic effects of hydroxyzine likely underlie its usefulness as an anxiolytic, as other antihistamines without such properties have not been found to be effective in the treatment of anxiety.

Hydroxyzine crosses the blood–brain barrier easily and exerts effects in the central nervous system. A positron emission tomography (PET) study found that brain occupancy of the H1 receptor was 67.6% for a single 30 mg dose of hydroxyzine. In addition, subjective sleepiness correlated well with the brain H1 receptor occupancy. PET studies with antihistamines have found that brain H1 receptor occupancy of more than 50% is associated with a high prevalence of somnolence and cognitive decline, whereas brain H1 receptor occupancy of less than 20% is considered to be non-sedative.

Hydroxyzine also acts as a functional inhibitor of Acid sphingomyelinase.

Pharmacokinetics
Hydroxyzine can be administered orally or via intramuscular injection. When given orally, hydroxyzine is rapidly absorbed from the gastrointestinal tract. Hydroxyzine is rapidly absorbed and distributed with oral and intramuscular administration, and is metabolized in the liver; the main metabolite (45%), cetirizine, is formed through oxidation of the alcohol moiety to a carboxylic acid by alcohol dehydrogenase, and overall effects are observed within one hour of administration. Higher concentrations are found in the skin than in the plasma. Cetirizine, although less sedating, is non-dialyzable and possesses similar antihistamine properties. The other metabolites identified include a N-dealkylated metabolite, and an O-dealkylated 1/16 metabolite with a plasma half-life of 59 hours. These pathways are mediated principally by CYP3A4 and CYP3A5. The N-dealykylated metabolite, norchlorcyclizine, bears some structural similarities to trazodone, but it has not been established whether it is pharmacologically active.  In animals, hydroxyzine and its metabolites are excreted in feces via biliary elimination.

The time to reach maximum concentration (Tmax) of hydroxyzine is about 2.0 hours in both adults and children and its elimination half-life is around 20.0 hours in adults (mean age 29.3 years) and 7.1 hours in children. Its elimination half-life is shorter in children compared to adults. In another study, the elimination half-life of hydroxyzine in elderly adults was 29.3 hours. One study found that the elimination half-life of hydroxyzine in adults was as short as 3 hours, but this may have just been due to methodological limitations. Although hydroxyzine has a long elimination half-life and acts, in-vivo, as an antihistamine for as long as 24 hours, the predominant CNS effects of hydroxyzine and other antihistamines with long half-lives seem to diminish after 8 hours.

Administration in geriatrics differs from the administration of hydroxyzine in younger patients; according to the FDA, there have not been significant studies made (2004), which include population groups over 65, which provide a distinction between elderly aged patients and other younger groups. Hydroxyzine should be administered carefully in the elderly with consideration given to possible reduced elimination.

Chemistry
Hydroxyzine is a member of the diphenylmethylpiperazine class of antihistamines.

Hydroxyzine is supplied mainly as a dihydrochloride salt (hydroxyzine hydrochloride) but also to a lesser extent as an embonate salt (hydroxyzine pamoate). The molecular weights of hydroxyzine, hydroxyzine dihydrochloride, and hydroxyzine pamoate are 374.9 g/mol, 447.8 g/mol, and 763.3 g/mol, respectively. Due to their differences in molecular weight, 1 mg hydroxyzine dihydrochloride is equivalent to about 1.7 mg hydroxyzine pamoate.

Analogues
Analogues of hydroxyzine include buclizine, cetirizine, cinnarizine, cyclizine, etodroxizine, meclizine, and pipoxizine among others.

Synthesis
Hydroxyzine is synthesized by the alkylation of 1-(4-chlorobenzhydryl)piperazine with 2-(2-chloroethoxy)ethanol:

Society and culture

Brand names
Hydroxyzine preparations require a doctor's prescription. The drug is available in two formulations, the pamoate (anxiolytic) and the dihydrochloride or hydrochloride salts (antihistamine). Vistaril, Equipose, Masmoran, and Paxistil are preparations of the pamoate salt, while Atarax, Alamon, Aterax, Durrax, Tran-Q, Orgatrax, Quiess, and Tranquizine are of the hydrochloride salt.

References

External links 
 

5-HT2A antagonists
Primary alcohols
Alpha-1 blockers
Antiemetics
Anxiolytics
Belgian inventions
CYP2D6 inhibitors
D2 antagonists
Ethers
H1 receptor antagonists
Chlorcyclizines
Sedatives
Serotonin receptor antagonists
Wikipedia medicine articles ready to translate